In chemistry, iron(III) refers to the element iron in its +3 oxidation state. In ionic compounds (salts), such an atom may occur as a separate cation (positive ion) denoted by Fe3+. 

The adjective ferric or the prefix ferri- is often used to specify such compounds — as in "ferric chloride" for iron(III) chloride, .  The adjective "ferrous" is used instead for iron(II) salts, containing the cation Fe2+.  The word ferric is derived from the Latin word ferrum for iron.

Iron(III) metal centres also occur in coordination complexes, such as in the anion ferrioxalate, where three bidentate oxalate ions surrounding the metal centre; or, in organometallic compounds, such as the ferrocenium cation , where two cyclopentadienyl anions are bound to the FeIII centre.

Iron is almost always encountered in the oxidation states 0 (as in the metal), +2, or +3.  Iron(III) is usually the most stable form in air, as illustrated by the pervasiveness of rust, an insoluble iron(III)-containing material.

Iron(III) and Life

Almost all known forms of life, particularly complex life, require iron. Many proteins in living beings contain bound iron(III) ions; those are an important subclass of the metalloproteins. Examples include oxyhemoglobin, ferredoxin, and the cytochromes.  

Nearly all living organisms, from bacteria to humans, store iron as microscopic crystals (3 to 8 nm in diameter) of iron(III) oxide hydroxide, inside  a shell of the protein ferritin, from which it can be recovered as needed. 

Insufficient iron in the human diet causes anemia.  Animals and humans can obtain the necessary iron from foods that contain it in assimilable form, such as meat. Other organisms must obtain their iron from the environment.  However, iron tends to form highly insoluble iron(III) oxides/hydroxides in aerobic (oxygenated) environment, especially in calcareous soils. Bacteria and grasses can thrive in such environments by secreting compounds called siderophores that form soluble complexes with iron(III), that can be reabsorbed into the cell. (The other plants instead encourage the growth around their roots of certain bacteria that reduce iron(III) to the more soluble iron(II).)  

The formation of insoluble iron(III) compounds is also responsible for the low levels of iron in seawater, which is often the limiting factor for the growth of the microscopic plants (phytoplankton) that are the basis of the marine food web.

The insolubility of iron(III) compounds can be exploited to remedy eutrophication (excessive growth of algae) in lakes contaminated by excess soluble phosphates from farm runoff. Iron(III) combines with the phosphates to form insoluble iron(III) phosphate, thus reducing the bioavailability of phosphorus — another essential element that may also be a limiting nutrient.

Chemistry of iron(III)
Some iron(III) salts, like the chloride  , sulfate , and nitrate  are soluble in water.  However, other compounds like oxide   (hematite) and iron(III) oxide-hydroxide  are extremely insoluble, at least at neutral pH, due to their polymeric structure.  Therefore, those soluble iron(III) salts tend to hydrolyze when dissolved in pure water, producing iron(III) hydroxide  that immediately converts to polymeric oxide-hydroxide via the process called olation and precipitates out of the solution.  That reaction liberates hydrogen ions  to the solution, lowering the pH, until an equilibrium is reached. 
 

As a result, concentrated solutions of iron(III) salts are quite acidic.  The easy reduction of iron(III) to iron(II) lets iron(III) salts function also as oxidizers.  Iron(III) chloride solutions are used to etch copper-coated plastic sheets in the production of printed circuit boards.

This behavior of iron(III) salts contrasts with salts of cations whose hydroxides are more soluble, like sodium chloride  (table salt), that dissolve in water without noticeable hydrolysis and without lowering the pH.

Rust is a mixture of iron(III) oxide and oxide-hydroxide that usually forms when iron metal is exposed to humid air.  Unlike the passivating oxide layers that are formed by other metals, like chromium and aluminum, rust flakes off, because it is bulkier than the metal that formed it.  Therefore, unprotected iron objects will in time be completely turned into rust.

Complexes

Iron(III) is a d5 center, meaning that the metal has five "valence" electrons in the 3d orbital shell. These partially filled or unfilled d-orbitals can accept a large variety of ligands to form coordination complexes.  The number and type of ligands is described by ligand field theory. Usually ferric ions are surrounded by six ligands arranged in octahedron; but sometimes three and sometimes as many as seven ligands are observed.

Various chelating compounds cause iron oxide-hydroxide (like rust) to dissolve even at neutral pH, by forming soluble complexes with the iron(III) ion that are more stable than it. These ligands include EDTA, which is often used to dissolve iron deposits or added to fertilizers to make iron in the soil available to plants. Citrate also solubilizes ferric ion at neutral pH, although its complexes are less stable than those of EDTA.

Magnetism

The magnetism of ferric compounds is mainly determined by the five d-electrons, and the ligands that connect to those orbitals.

Analysis

In qualitative inorganic analysis, the presence of ferric ion can be detected by the formation of its thiocyanate complex. Addition of thiocyanate salts to the solution gives the intensely red 1:1 complex. The reaction is a classic school experiment to demonstrate Le Chatelier's principle:

See also

  (Iron(III) chloride)
  (Iron(III) oxide)
  (Iron(III) fluoride)

References

Iron(III) compounds